Club Deportivo Pontellas is a Spanish football team located in Pontellas, municipality O Porriño in the province of Pontevedra in the autonomous community of Galicia. Founded in 1962 it currently plays in Tercera División – Group 1 holding home matches at Campo de Fútbol de San Campio with a capacity of 1,500 spectators.

History 
CD Pontellas was founded in 1962. The club was promoted to the Tercera División for the first time in 2019.

Season to season

2 seasons in Tercera División

References

Association football clubs established in 1962
Football clubs in Galicia (Spain)
1962 establishments in Spain
Divisiones Regionales de Fútbol clubs